Air Chief Marshal Sir George Clark Pirie,  (28 July 1896 – 21 January 1980) was a senior commander in the Royal Air Force during the Second World War and the immediate post-war years. During the First World War, Pirie served as an infantry officer before transferring to the Royal Flying Corps where he took up duties as an observer officer.

RAF career
Educated at Fettes College in Edinburgh and the University of St Andrews, Pirie volunteered for service with the Cameronians (Scottish Rifles) just after the outbreak of the First World War. He was gazetted as a second lieutenant on 19 September 1914. In March 1916 Pirie began training to be an observer with No. 2 Squadron of the Royal Flying Corps. He became Officer Commanding No. 6 Squadron on the Western Front in 1918. Pirie was still serving with 6 Squadron when it moved to the Middle East and served with the squadron when he was awarded the Distinguished Flying Cross (DFC) for services in Mesopotamia. The citation for his DFC, which was listed in the London Gazette dated 28 October 1921, stated the award was: "For great gallantry and good work, especially during operations in the relief of Diwaniyah and during our retirement to Hillah. This officer showed remarkable ability in quick initiative when leading his flight during 'operations".

After the war he served as Officer Commanding No. 29 Squadron before becoming Station Commander at RAF Tangmere in 1933. He was made deputy director of Operations at the Air Ministry in 1936 and Air Attaché in Washington D. C. in 1937. He served in the Second World War as Air Officer Commanding the RAF in Northern Ireland and as Air Officer Administration at Headquarters Middle East Command before becoming Director of War Organisation and then Director-General of Organisation at the Air Ministry. He completed his war service as Deputy Air Commander in Chief at Air Command South East Asia in 1945.

After the War he was Air Officer Commanding-in-Chief, Air Command South East Asia and Air Officer Commanding-in-Chief, Air Command Far East before becoming Inspector-General of the RAF in 1948. He was made Air Member for Supply and Organisation in September 1948 and Head of the RAF Staff in Washington D. C. in 1950 before retiring in 1951.

References

External links
National Portrait Gallery – Sir George Clark Pirie

|-

|-

|-

1896 births
1980 deaths
Royal Air Force air marshals
Alumni of the University of St Andrews
Cameronians officers
People educated at Fettes College
Royal Flying Corps officers
Royal Air Force personnel of World War II
Knights Commander of the Order of the Bath
Knights Commander of the Order of the British Empire
Recipients of the Military Cross
Recipients of the Distinguished Flying Cross (United Kingdom)
British air attachés
People from Pittenweem
Scottish airmen
British Army personnel of World War I